ZALA 421-08 is a micro air vehicle developed and produced by the Izhevsk-based ZALA Aero company. It is a small, portable and reliable UAV platform. Weighing only 9 kg it includes 2 aerial vehicles, compact ground control station, 2 spare power supply kits and backpack container used for transportation. ZALA 421-08 is designed for front-line reconnaissance, overground and oversea surveillance.
It takes 3 minutes to prepare ZALA for launching. The UAV is operated in the autonomous or semi-autonomous mode.

Variants 
421-08M

 Improved variant with a longer range radio link

Specifications 
Physical:
Wingspan: 0.8 m
Length: 0.41 m
Weight: 1.7 kg
Flight altitude: 3600 m max above sea level
Radio link: 15 km
Maximum flight duration: 90 min – with electric engine
Speed range: 65–150 km/h
Launch: autonomously from hands
Landing: parachute
Navigation: Glonass/GPS
Overall size (2 UAVs and GCS): 8 kg

Payload:
 Color Video camera  (550 TVL)
 Infrared camera
 Photo camera (10 megapixels)

References

External links 

 Official site.

Unmanned aerial vehicles of Russia
421-08
Unmanned military aircraft of Russia